Homing is the phenomenon whereby cells migrate to the organ of their origin. By homing, transplanted hematopoietic cells are able to travel to and engraft (establish residence) in the bone marrow. Various chemokines and receptors  are involved in the homing of hematopoietic stem cells.

Sites
 Bone marrow
 Lymph nodes
 Skin

References

Hematology